John Thomas Bayley (August 1868 – after 1899), generally known as Tom Bayley, was an English professional footballer who played as a right back. Born in Walsall, Staffordshire, he played for Walsall Town Swifts and Small Heath in the Football Alliance before going on to make 130 appearances in the Football League representing Small Heath, Walsall Town Swifts and Gainsborough Trinity. He later played for South Shields, Southern League club Watford, and Leamington Town.

References

1868 births
Year of death missing
Place of death missing
Sportspeople from Walsall
English footballers
Association football fullbacks
Walsall F.C. players
Birmingham City F.C. players
Gainsborough Trinity F.C. players
South Shields F.C. (1889) players
Watford F.C. players
Leamington F.C. players
English Football League players
Southern Football League players
Football Alliance players